William Hatherell (18 October 1855, in Bristol – 7 December 1928, in London) was a British painter and illustrator who worked in genres including history painting, Arthurian legend, and the sentimental.

Biography 

William Hatherell was born in Westbury-on-Trym, Bristol, on 18 October 1855. He studied art at the Royal Academy Schools from 1877 to 1879.

From the 1880s he created illustrations for magazines such as The Graphic and Harper's New Monthly Magazine. He became a member of the Royal Institute of Painters in Watercolours in 1888, and of the Royal Institute of Oil Painters in 1898. He joined the Langham Sketching Club in 1900. He became a member of the Royal West of England Academy, Bristol, in 1903, and of the American Society of Illustrators in 1905. He worked in genres including history painting, Arthurian legend, and the sentimental.

Hatherell illustrated a variety of books, making 22 watercolours for Hodder's edition of Shakespeare's Romeo and Juliet. He illustrated Thomas Hardy's  "The Fiddler of the Reels" for Scribner's Magazine in 1893, and Jude the Obscure when it was brought out in twelve parts in Harper's New Monthly Magazine from December 1894 to November 1895.

He travelled to Australia on a commission from Cassell's to create illustrations for their 1890 book Picturesque Australasia. He returned to live in Brondesbury in northwest London, creating a garden that often forms the background in his paintings of the period.

He died in London on 7 December 1928.

Works

References

Further reading 

 Hodnett, Edward. Image And Text: Studies In The Illustration Of English Literature. Scolar, 1986.
 Houfe, Simon. The Dictionary of British Book Illustrators and Caricaturists, 1800-1914: with Introductory Chapters on the Rise and Progress of the Art. Antique Collectors' Club, 1981. pp. 141, 208.

1855 births
1928 deaths
19th-century English artists
20th-century English artists